Amperveilsee is a lake above Vals in the canton of Grisons, Switzerland.

A popular hike starts at Zervreila, passes the three remote lakes Guraletschsee, Amperveilsee and Selvasee and descends via Selva Alp to Vals. Vals is famous for its spa.

References

Lakes of Graubünden
Lakes of Switzerland
Vals, Switzerland
LAmperveilsee